Cosmopolis: An International Monthly Review was a multi-lingual literary magazine published between January 1896 and November 1898. The lead edition of Cosmopolis was published in London, but local editions of the magazine were also published in Berlin, Paris, and Saint Petersburg.

Each edition of Cosmopolis contained non-fiction articles, literary reviews, and new fiction in English, French, and German; later editions also contained material in Russian.

Cosmopolis was edited by Fernand Ortmans and was published in London by T. Fisher Unwin. It had a circulation of approximately 20,000.

Fictional namesake 
Jack Vance's Demon Princes novels have occasional reference to a magazine called Cosmopolis (no subtitle) that is bought by the lead character.

References
Julia Reid. "The Academy and Cosmopolis: Evolution and Culture in Robert Louis Stevenson's Periodical Encounters" in Louse Henson et al. (eds., 2004). Culture and Science in the Nineteenth-Century Media (Aldershot: Ashgate Publishers) pp. 263–274.

External links

Defunct literary magazines published in the United Kingdom
English-language magazines
French-language magazines
German-language magazines
Magazines published in London
Magazines established in 1896
Magazines disestablished in 1898
Multilingual magazines
Russian-language magazines
Magazines published in Saint Petersburg
Magazines published in Paris